Törnros is a Swedish surname. Notable people with the surname include:

Erik Törnros (born 1993), Swedish football player
Gustaf Törnros (1887–1941), Swedish long-distance runner
Nabot Törnros (1878–1914), Swedish painter, illustrator, and cartoonist

Swedish-language surnames